Morris Peak is a prominent peak,  high, marking the northwest end of the Duncan Mountains of Antarctica, at the east side of the mouth of Liv Glacier where the latter enters Ross Ice Shelf. It was named by the Advisory Committee on Antarctic Names for Lieutenant Commander H.C. Morris, U.S. Navy, commanding officer of the  during Operation Deep Freeze 1963.

References

Mountains of the Ross Dependency
Amundsen Coast